The Norwin School District is a large, suburban public school district. It is located in western Westmoreland County, Pennsylvania, United States of America. A tiny portion of the district extends into Allegheny County. Norwin School District serves North Huntingdon, Irwin, and North Irwin, which are Pittsburgh suburbs. The District covers twenty  while serving as home to approximately 34,000 residents in 2000. By 2010, the district's population increased to 35,514 people. In 2009, the Districts residents' per capita income was $20,393, while the median family income was $50,728. The district contains The district contains four elementary schools along with Hillcrest Intermediate School (grades 5–6), Norwin Middle School (grades 7–8), and Norwin High School (grades 9–12). Norwin High School uses the services of Central Westmoreland Career and Technology Center in New Stanton for the students there who wish to choose a vocational or technical program.

Extracurriculars
The secondary schools in the Norwin School District offer a wide variety of extracurricular activities.

Sports
Nineteen varsity level sports are provided, including baseball, softball, lacrosse (boys and girls), basketball (boys and girls), soccer (boys and girls), cross country (boys and girls), swimming (boys and girls), track (boys and girls), golf (boys and girls), volleyball (boys and girls), tennis (boys and girls), field hockey, football and wrestling. Bowling and ice hockey are club sports.

References

External links 

Norwin Band
Norwin Girls Field Hockey Team
Norwin Girls Soccer Team
Norwin Football
Norwin Cross Country

School districts established in 1958
School districts in Westmoreland County, Pennsylvania
Education in Pittsburgh area
1958 establishments in Pennsylvania